The Wreford Limestone is a geologic formation in Kansas. It preserves fossils dating back to the Permian period.

The Schroyer Limestone and Threemile Limestone members of the Wreford Limestone formation are the lowest of the flint-bearing rock layers of the Flint Hills.

See also

 List of fossiliferous stratigraphic units in Kansas
 Paleontology in Kansas

References

Permian Kansas